Semiha Borovac (born 2 March 1955) is a Bosnian politician who served as the 35th Mayor of Sarajevo, holding office from 2005 until 2009. She is Sarajevo's first female mayor and is also a member of the Party of Democratic Action. Borovac was also the Minister of Human Rights and Refugees from 2015 to 2019.

Education
Borovac attended first the "Ahmet Fetahagić" elementary school and then the "Druga Gimnazija" secondary school in Sarajevo. She went on to university, graduating from the Sarajevo Law School in 1977 and qualifying as a judge in 2000. In 2001 she also qualified as a trainer with the Citizens' Association for Local Development Initiative.

Political career
Borovac served as the 35th Mayor of Sarajevo from 2005 until 2009.

She became the new Minister of Human Rights and Refugees on 31 March 2015 in the government of Denis Zvizdić. Within her first year in office, Borovac met with refugee families across Bosnia and Herzegovina. On 26 January 2016, Borovac signed an agreement with mayors from cities throughout the country and ministers of both entities, promising to have 438 homes built for families displaced by the Bosnian War of the 1990s. Her term as Minister ended on 23 December 2019.

Personal life
Semiha is married to Miralem Borovac and together they have two daughters.

References

External links

|-

1955 births
Living people
Bosniaks of Bosnia and Herzegovina
Bosnia and Herzegovina Muslims
Sarajevo Law School alumni
Party of Democratic Action politicians
21st-century women politicians
Mayors of Sarajevo
Women mayors of places in Bosnia and Herzegovina
Human rights ministers of Bosnia and Herzegovina